Justin Rodrell Gilbert (born November 7, 1991) is a former American football cornerback. He was drafted by the Cleveland Browns with the eighth pick in the 2014 NFL Draft after playing college football at Oklahoma State. He has also been a member of the Pittsburgh Steelers.

Early years
Gilbert attended Huntsville High School in Huntsville, Texas, where he was a three-sport star in football, basketball and track. He played as a defensive back and quarterback for the Huntsville Hornets football team, and was a two-time district MVP. He was a SuperPrep All-region selection and was ranked by that publication as the No. 51 player in Texas. As a junior, he accumulated 785 passing yards and 628 rushing yards. In his senior year, he rushed for over 1,000 yards with nine touchdowns and passed for over 800 yards.

Also a standout track & field athlete, Gilbert was one of the state's top sprinters. He captured two regional titles at the 2010 State 3-4A Regional, winning the 100-meter dash, with a time of 10.47 second, and the 200-meter dash, with a time of 21.29 seconds, while also placing second in the long jump (6.78 meters) and anchoring the 4x100 squad to a second-place finish.

Considered a four-star recruit by Rivals.com, Gilbert was listed as the No. 37 athlete in the state of Texas in 2010.

College career
Gilbert attended Oklahoma State University between 2010 and 2013. As a true freshman in 2010, Gilbert was a backup cornerback and kick returner. For the season he had 18 tackles and returned two kickoff returns for touchdowns. He was named a freshman All-American by Rivals.com. As a sophomore in 2011, he had 48 tackles, five interceptions and two kickoff return touchdowns. He was the defensive MVP of the 2012 Fiesta Bowl. As a junior in 2012, he had 53 tackles and one kickoff return for a touchdown. He nearly entered the 2013 NFL Draft but decided against it. As a senior in 2013, he set the Big 12 Conference record for kickoff return touchdowns with six. He was also a finalist for the Jim Thorpe Award. Gilbert won the 2013 College Football Performance Award as the nation's top defensive back.

Professional career

Cleveland Browns
Gilbert was considered one of the top cornerback prospects for the 2014 NFL Draft. Gilbert was selected with the eighth pick in the first round by the Cleveland Browns.

After a slow start to his rookie season, when he had missed two games with an illness and a heel injury, Gilbert played in Week 14 against the Indianapolis Colts when teammate K'Waun Williams was injured. He ended the game with four tackles and one interception, which he returned for a touchdown. The Colts won 25-24.

Pittsburgh Steelers
On September 3, 2016, Gilbert was traded to the Pittsburgh Steelers for a 2018 sixth-round draft pick.

After not seeing the field in Week 1 against the Washington Redskins, Gilbert made his Steelers debut against the Cincinnati Bengals on September 18, playing exclusively on special teams. After another week of special teams duty against the Philadelphia Eagles, Gilbert made his debut on defense against the Kansas City Chiefs on October 2, covering Travis Kelce. Through the first 10 weeks, he played only 11 defensive snaps and was mainly used on kickoff coverage, but he returned three kickoffs for 69 yards. 

During the 2016 season, Gilbert played in 12 games, recording one solo tackle and assisting on two others. He also made his NFL postseason debut, playing against the Kansas City Chiefs and New England Patriots, returning three kickoffs for 43 yards. 

On February 6, 2017, Gilbert was released by the Steelers.

On June 20, 2017, Gilbert was suspended by NFL commissioner Roger Goodell for one year for violating the league's substance-abuse policy.

References

External links
Cleveland Browns bio
Oklahoma State Cowboys bio

1991 births
Living people
Players of American football from Houston
American football cornerbacks
American football return specialists
Oklahoma State Cowboys football players
Cleveland Browns players
Pittsburgh Steelers players
All-American college football players
People from Huntsville, Texas